Nathalie Ludwig (born 11 December 1995) is a Luxembourger footballer who plays as a forward for Dames Ligue 1 club Entente/Rosport and the Luxembourg women's national team.

International career
Ludwig made her senior debut for Luxembourg on 16 February 2022 during a 5–0 friendly win against Tahiti.

International goals

References

1995 births
Living people
Women's association football forwards
Luxembourgian women's footballers
Luxembourg women's international footballers